In the area of organometallic chemistry, a bulky cyclopentadienyl ligand is jargon for a ligand of the type  where R is a branched alkyl and n = 3 or 4.  Representative examples are the tetraisopropyl derivative  and the tris(tert-butyl) derivative .  These ligands are so large that their complexes behave differently from the pentamethylcyclopentadienyl analogues.  Because they cannot closely approach the metal, these bulky ligands stabilize high spin complexes, such as (C5H2tBu3)2Fe2I2.  These large ligands stabilize highly unsaturated derivatives such as (C5H2tBu3)2Fe2N2.

Synthesis and reactions

The (tert-butyl)cyclopentadiene is  prepared by alkylation of cyclopentadiene with tert-butyl bromide in the presence of sodium hydride and dibenzo-18-crown-6. The intermediate in this synthesis is di-tert-butylcyclopentadiene.  This compound is conveniently prepared by alkylation of cyclobutadiene with tert-butyl bromide under phase-transfer conditions.

Illustrative of the unusual complexes made possible with these bulky ligands is molecular iron nitrido complex (tBu3C5H2)2Fe2N2.  In contrast to (C5Me5)2Ir2Cl4, (tBu3C5H2)IrCl2 is monomeric.

References

Organometallic chemistry